The Nissan Micra, also known as the , is a supermini car (B-segment) that has been produced by the Japanese automobile manufacturer Nissan since 1982.

The Nissan Micra replaced the Japanese-market Nissan Cherry. It was exclusive to Nissan Japanese dealership network Nissan Cherry Store until 1999 when the "Cherry" network was combined into Nissan Red Stage until 2003. Until Nissan began selling kei cars in Japan, the March was Nissan's smallest vehicle, and was not renamed and sold at other Japanese Nissan dealership networks.



First generation (K10; 1982)

The original Micra (chassis name K10) was introduced onto the Japanese market in October 1982 as a challenger to the Honda City, Daihatsu Charade, Suzuki Cultus, and Toyota Starlet. It was intended to replace the Nissan Cherry as the company's competitor in the supermini sector, as the Cherry model sold in Europe had progressively become larger with each successive generation. In Japan, it was exclusive to Nissan Cherry store locations, as the Japanese market Cherry was renamed March, benefiting from engineering contributions from Nissan's 1966 acquisition of the Prince Motor Company, who originally developed the outgoing Cherry. The Micra had particularly low fuel consumption made possible by a specially developed engine only used in the Micra, an uncommonly high gearing, and a particularly low weight: only  in early European trim. The low weight target necessitated a minimum of insulation, meaning that early Micras were quite loud. Japanese owners benefitted from the engine below 1000cc when it came time to pay the annual road tax obligation.
 
The body style was originally designed for Fiat as a replacement for the Fiat 127, but Fiat then adopted the Giugiaro-styled Uno instead. It was introduced in the European market in June 1983, and in Canada in 1984 for the 1985 model year (replacing the slightly larger Nissan Pulsar hatchbacks). Because the Micra was launched during Nissan's rebranding effort to systematically phase out the Datsun name, a small  appeared on the tailgate for the first two years, and in some European markets, the car was known as the "Datsun-Nissan Micra". The Datsun badges had disappeared completely by the end of 1984. The Micra was initially available with an extremely refined all-aluminium MA10S SOHC engine. It was also available with either automatic (called "Nissanmatic"), four-speed or five-speed gearbox. Both the automatic and five-speed manual gearboxes were unusual in a supermini at this time. The Nissanmatic model originally had a  version of the 1-liter engine.

It was one of several important small cars to be launched onto the European market during 1983. Also launched that year were the Fiat Uno, Peugeot 205, Vauxhall Nova (a Britain-only model which had been launched across Europe the previous year as the Opel Corsa) and the second generation of the Ford Fiesta. It sold well in Britain, being launched there in June 1983 and peaking at more than 50,000 sales for the year in 1989, and was one of the most popular imported cars of its era.

The model was revised in June 1985, identifiable by a restyled tailgate and larger rear lamp clusters. The Japanese market saw the debut of the first Micra Turbo/MA10ET, where Nissan grafted a turbocharger to the small 1.0 L engine. This version was never sold in Europe, where the only engines ever available were the 1.0 and 1.2 units. A non-catalyzed version produced 60 PS. Another facelift came in March 1989, which consisted of some minor upgrades such as deeper bumpers, a new front grille, minor interior details, and headlight changes. This was also when the five-door hatchback version was introduced in Europe, shortly before Ford launched the third-generation Fiesta which also offered a 5-door model for the first time.

The Micra's chassis spawned a number of variations. The Be-1 (BK10), launched at the Tokyo Motor Show in 1985 (but not sold until 1987), was a limited edition model with a more rounded bodyshape, and only 10,000 were sold. In 1987, the canvas-topped, retro-looking hatchback Pao (パオ) (PK10) was launched (also at the Tokyo Motor Show) and sold to the public in 1989; 51,657 units were sold. The canvas-topped Figaro (フィガロ) (FK10) coupé was unveiled at the same show in 1989, but not released until 1991. Because demand for the Figaro exceeded the 20,000 vehicles built, Nissan sold the car by lottery: winners could place orders for the car. Despite being a JDM-only model, the Figaro is one of the most imported models of the K10 derivatives; its popularity among numerous celebrity owners helped it earn cult status. The K10 ceased production on 21 December 1992, although its replacement had gone into production some months earlier.

During its lifetime, the Micra gained a good reputation for reliability and economy. In 1995, it topped the small car class in a reliability survey of four to six-year-old cars undertaken by the German Automobile Association (ADAC), with 7.5 recorded breakdowns per 1,000 vehicles for four-year-old Micras and 11.5 for six-year-old cars: this compared with 8.0 breakdowns per 1,000 cars for four-year-old Volkswagen Polos and 15.3 for six-year-old Polos. (The class loser was the Fiat Uno with 20.7 breakdowns per 1,000 for four-year-old cars and 37.3 for six-year-old Unos. In the longer term, the Micra would also go on to achieve a much higher survival rate than many of its competitors.)

For the 1991 model year, a rebadged Nissan Sentra B12 entered Canada to replace the Micra as the Nissan Sentra Classic after Nissan announced it would not import the Micra to Canada after 1991. The Sentra Classics were built in Mexico.

Super S

The European market Super S trim became available along with the second facelift in 1989. Sporty Super S included a factory body kit, racing seats and a tachometer and was only available in black, gray, white and red. Despite its appearance it had the same MA12 engine as the standard K10 Micra, although catalytic converters were a non-deletable feature on the car making them slightly less powerful than the non-cat cars.

Super Turbo

In 1988, Nissan launched a limited 10,000-unit run of its homologated (certified) Nissan 1989 Micra Super Turbo (EK10GFR/GAR). Both this and the 1988 Micra R (EK10FR) featured the same highly advanced sequential compound charged (supercharger plus turbocharger) engine in an all-aluminium straight-four 930 cc eight-valve MA09ERT unit that produced  at 6400 rpm. This car came with either a 3-speed automatic or 5-speed manual gearbox with viscous limited slip differential, as well as options such as air conditioning and electric mirrors. The Micra Super Turbo still holds the crown for the fastest production Micra in Nissan's history, with factory performance figures of 7.7 seconds to go from 0 to 100 km/h (62 mph) and 15.5 seconds to run a quarter-mile.

Second generation (K11; 1992)

Micra K11 (1992–1997)

The second-generation K11 was built in the UK, Japan and Taiwan. It was launched in Japan in January 1992, and released in Europe in the fourth quarter of the year. It was the second Nissan model line to be produced in the UK at the Nissan Motor Manufacturing UK (NMUK) plant, Washington Tyne and Wear. A diesel version was offered with the 1.5 L PSA TUD market in Europe as Micra 1.5 D. CVT automatic transmission and Power steering was an option on some models, and the equipment list included safety features not usually available in this market segment: a toughened safety-cage and side-impact door beams were standard and pre-tensioning seat-belts and a driver's air-bag were optional. However, the Mk2 Micra scored only a modest two stars in Euro NCAP testing in 1997. Airbags, antilock brakes, electric windows, central locking and air conditioning were as either standard equipment or options on some models in the Micra range. The European model range consisted of 1.0L and LX, 1.3LX, SLX and Super S. The car soon won the European Car of the Year award for 1993 (the first Japanese car to do so) and the Good Design Award (a Trade and Industry Design award in Japan) along with the Car of the Year Japan award in 1992. At its introduction in 1993, it won the Automotive Researchers' and Journalists' Conference Car of the Year award in Japan. Having won several awards, Nissan manufactured the V3 Award edition.

After receiving minor changes in 1996, the Micra received a facelift in 1998, six years after its launch.

There was a Cabriolet (FHK11) unveiled at the Tokyo Motor Show in 1995, but it was not sold until August 1997, with an electric top. These were produced in limited numbers for the Japanese Domestic Market (JDM) only. However, much like the Nissan Figaro, some have been imported into the UK unofficially. There was also an estate version called the March Box (WK11), which was unveiled on November 1999, with a double folding rear seat, along with an automatic transmission four-wheel drive model.

K11C (facelift)
In late 1997, a facelift version was introduced, and was built from late 1997 until early 2003. Only a few units were produced in 1997, as most of them started in 1998.

The cumulative visual changes from the first models included a revised front grille and headlights, redesigned front and rear bumpers, oval instead of round side repeater indicators, major changes to the interior and dashboard, redesigned rear light lenses, and a radio aerial repositioned from the top of the right-hand A-pillar to the middle of the roof, towards the rear.

In late 2000, the original facelift was replaced by a second version known as the K11C, While it still looked quite similar from the outside, the engines had been updated to run on the newer individual coilpack system (whereas the earlier models had been fitted with a distributor). As well as this, the secondary catalytic converter was removed and the primary catalytic converter (on the manifold) was enlarged. Other exterior changes included new lights on the bumper, an altered lower body, orange turn signals and minor changes to the interior. Further changes included a redesigned rear wiper which rested horizontally instead of vertically, and the centre high level brake lamp being reduced in size and mounted at the top of the rear window, instead of on the parcel shelf.

The 1.3l (1275CC) CG13DE engine offered in previous K11s were removed in the second facelift, and replaced by a 1,348 cc "1.4" unit (CGA3DE). The 1.0l CG10DE remained in the second facelift models but had a slightly higher power output ( compared to the earlier )

In 2001, Muji, the well-known Japanese "non-brand" issued a limited release of 1,000 badgeless and decontented Nissan Marches, only available online. It was intended as an exercise to test their online marketing systems and was sold as the "Muji Car 1000" (ムジ・カー 1000). The rear seat is upholstered in vinyl, the hubcaps are minimal, and the car was only offered in "marble white". The Muji Car 1000 has a four-speed automatic transmission and the 1 litre CG10DE engine.

By late 2002, the new K12 was introduced (although the S and SE models were still being built). They were fully replaced by K12 in early 2003.

Bolero

The Bolero was a luxury model available in certain markets from 1999 to 2003. It featured a redesigned exterior, and an interior which had leather seats.

The model with the different front was also available in Taiwan as Nissan Verita. The Verita was also sold in the Philippines.

Super S
Super S trim was available in 1993–1997, then the name was changed to SR (Facelift). Differences include a slightly faster 3.6 turns lock-to-lock rack, over the standard 3.8 turns, different colour-coded front and rear bumpers, colour-coded wing mirrors and bump strips, rear wrap-around spoiler, front fog lights, remote fuel flap opening, wider 175/60/r13 tyres, rear ashtray, tachometer, more heavily bolstered seats, split folding rear seats and rear speaker shelf as standard. Features such as electric windows and power steering were still optional extras. The only engine available for the Super S was the  CG13DE/ 1.3 twin cam 16v engine.

Micra Challenge
In Greece, a hot hatch version was developed to compete with the massively successful Peugeot 106 Rallye and Fiat Punto GT. It was based on the CG13DE 16-valve engine but had a more aggressive overhead cam and a completely new exhaust system which together made 20 more horsepower. It was equipped with Eibach coilovers and Kayaba buffer suspension. Just like the Super S, it was fitted with 175/60/R13 tires.

Third generation (K12; 2002)

Micra K12 (2002–2010)
The next version of the Micra, the K12, was unveiled in production form at the 2002 Paris Motor Show, following the lines of the Nissan mm.e concept car presented the year before at the Frankfurt Motor Show. It was introduced to the Japanese market in February 2002 and to the European market at the end of 2002., The car was restyled, featuring a new, 70 mm longer wheelbase (developed with Renault), increased height and width, and prominent headlamps  extending into the wings/fenders. The redesign coincided with the Japanese Nissan dealership network Nissan Cherry Store being renamed Nissan Red Stage in 1999. Other features included a sliding rear seat and  optional keyless ignition. The range of engines included improved 1.2 (CR12DE) and 1.4 (CR14DE) petrol models, and a Renault-sourced 1.5 diesel unit (K9K). The automatic CVT transmission of the previous model was replaced by a conventional automatic transmission.

Though its successor came out in 2010, the K12 was produced up through model year 2011.

Euro NCAP tested a Micra 1.2 S in 2003 achieving safety ratings of:
 Adult Occupant: 
 Pedestrian:

Nissan March (2002–2010)
The vehicle was unveiled in Nissan Headquarters Gallery, and in Nissan's Ginza Gallery in a wide array of color variations.

March Enchante includes a swivel front passenger's seat that turns 90° to facilitate easy ingress and egress. The March Driving Helper is fitted with hand-operated driving controls to enable persons with leg disabilities to drive and a control lever for operating the accelerator and the brakes with the left hand. These hand-operated controls are incorporated in the Autech Driving Control package, developed originally by Autech Japan for Nissan vehicles.

The March Enchante was unveiled at the 2004 Tokyo Motor Show.

The vehicles went on sale on 5 March 2002. Early models include 14e (5-door), 12c (3/5-door), 10b (3/5-door). Early March Enchante models include 12c (3/5-door). Early March Driving Helper models include 12c (3/5-door).

Nissan March Rafeet and 4WD models (2002–2007)

The March Rafeet and 4WD models went on sale on 5 September 2002. Early March Rafeet models include 12c, 14c-four. Other four wheel drive models included March Enchante (14c-four, 14e-four), March Enchante flip seat (14c-four), March Driving Helper (14c-four).

Nissan Micra R (2003)
In 2003, Nissan UK, inspired by the Andros Trophy K11, unveiled the Micra-R, a one-off mid-engined K12. Shown at the Geneva Motor Show without running gear and engine, being only a display car, it was later given the go-ahead and Nissan commissioned Ray Mallock Ltd to insert a mid-mounted BTCC-derived Primera QG20DE engine for show and press demonstration purposes. In 2005, Nissan UK decided to replace the Primera engine with a VQ35DE from a 350Z with a modified Altima SE-R gearbox for user-friendliness on the road. This model was baptized 350SR, although it was not offered for sale. It was taken on to EVO magazine's "fast fleet" for a period of time where it became a favourite of many of the writers. Other modifications to this car include a vented rear arch and a set of Rays wheels. To date, Nissan has no plans to put this model into production.

2004 update

Nissan Micra (2004-2007)

Changes include addition of clear front indicator lamps, a new seven-spoke design of 15" wheel covers, body-coloured powered door mirrors and door handles, front seats with improved support, addition of remote controls for the CD audio system and drive computer. Even though clear indicator lamps were added in 2004, not all models received them. Some Micras produced kept the original indicator lamps.

The vehicle was unveiled at the 2004 Paris Motor Show.

Bolero, Rafeet

Autech, a Nissan-owned company, unveiled alternative models called the Bolero and the Rafeet. The Bolero, like Autech's versions of the K11, has the usual retro front end (which with the standard Micra headlights makes the car resemble the Lancia Ypsilon); the Rafeet has a more modern approach, resembling a BMW MINI, with either a black or white leather interior, whereas the Bolero has partial wood panelling and exclusive seating.

Nissan Micra C+C (2005–2010)

In 2005, the K12 chassis spawned the coupé convertible model called the Nissan Micra C+C. The vehicle was unveiled at the 2005 Frankfurt Motor Show, followed by the 2006 Geneva Motor Show. It was designed at the new London-based Nissan Design Europe studio, developed at the Nissan Technical Centre Europe at Cranfield, 
Bedfordshire and built, as with its predecessor, at the Sunderland plant. It is built as a modern interpretation of the 1991 Micra-based Nissan Figaro with a convertible hardtop instead of the canvas top the Figaro had. The electric folding glass roof is made by Karmann coachworks and has a 2+2 seating layout. The car is powered by a 1.4 or 1.6 L gasoline engine, or a 1.5 L diesel available on European versions only. The Japanese model (with HR16DE engine, 5-speed manual or 4-speed electronic automatic transmission) went on sale as 2007 model in limited quantities (1500 units) on 23 July 2007.

There were originally four trim levels: Urbis, Sport, Essenza and Active Luxury.

In October 2013, Top Gear magazine placed the Micra C+C on its list of "The 13 worst cars of the last 20 years", on the basis that "If you need us to justify its inclusion here, you are not only reading the wrong mag [...] As much fun as sticking chilli-infused toothpicks in your eyes."

2005 update

Changes to Nissan March include:
 Redesigned front grille, front bumper, 14-inch full wheel cover, rear combination lamps, rear bumper
 New seat cloth, reshaped seat
 Added floor trim cloth
 Redesigned meter
 Headlamp manual levellizer (with xenon headlamp auto levellizer)
 Change to HR15DE engine
Micra 12SR is a version of Nissan March with:
 CR12DE engine with stainless exhaust manifold, cylinder head port polish
 Redesigned suspension, power steering assist
 Enlarged front brake rotor
 Tail crossbar
 SR-exclusive front spoiler, rear under protector, large roof spoiler, under body aerodynamic parts
 Exclusive sport seat, meter, aluminium pedal, grade and black interior colour scheme
Japanese models went on sale on 25 August 2005.

Nissan Micra 160 SR (2005–2010)
In 2005, Nissan Europe released a performance model of the K12. Dubbed the 160 SR, it is equipped with a 1.6 L HR16DE engine, giving  and uprated sports suspension. In 2006, Nissan renamed the 160 SR to the Sport SR in line with name changes across the board for the K12. However, this rebranding was short-lived: the performance model reverted to the 160 SR name in late 2007.

The launch of the 160 SR coincided with a revision of the K12. The radiator grilles were given a chrome strip through the centre and the original amber indicators were replaced with clear ones. The rear bumper was restyled and made more robust (apparently in response to French parking habits). The interior was also given a makeover, with more supportive seats, thicker glass and better soundproofing.

There were originally six trim levels of the K12, but in 2006 they were simplified to just three: Initia, Spirita and Sport. In addition, the launch line-up of six engines was reduced to the most popular four. The vehicle was unveiled at the 2005 Frankfurt Motor Show.

Micra K12C (2007–2010)

In late 2007, the Nissan Micra was facelifted again. It had several cosmetic tweaks: every model featured the standard racing grille taken from the K12 160 SR; the front headlights were tidied up (incorporating light blue-tinted sidelights) and the grilles housing the indicators were edged in chrome. Inside, there were new seat fabric designs, and the dashboard featured parts taken from other Nissans. New equipment included an audible speed warning, bluetooth connectivity with the vehicle and reversing sensors. All models (save for entry-level) were fitted with sport bumpers and spoilers on the sides and rear. Larger wing mirrors were also added on some models.

The 1.2-litre engine for the entry-level Visia was a  unit, as opposed to the  version on other grades. In addition, the Visia did not have the option of a 1.4 L engine. The 1.6 L engine was reserved for the 160 SR and as an option on the Active Luxury grade.

Starting from 2007, Nissan began selling the K12 in Australia. Imported from Japan, all were five-door hatchbacks, with the 1.4-litre petrol engine and automatic transmission. The only factory option was the City Collection pack, which included an upgraded six-disc sound system, six-spoke alloy wheels, and side and curtain airbags. The Australian specification adopted the Japanese facelift, with indicators integrated into the headlamps.

In 2009, it was reported that a total of 31,600 units were sold in Japan and nearly 122,000 worldwide.

Fourth generation (K13; 2010)

The first sketches of the fourth generation Nissan Micra, first internally referred as W02A as the development code and as K13 for the model code, were unveiled on 1 October 2009. The car was first displayed at the 80th Geneva International Motor Show.

It was sold in more than 160 countries, including Thailand from March 2010, India from July 2010, Europe from November 2010, and Indonesia from December 2010. It was the first March/Micra to be built in a North American plant, even though this generation did not have any sales in the United States. The K13 was however available in Canada after the spring of 2014.

It is based on the V platform with a new 1.2-litre HR12DE (XH5)  , 3-cylinder engine (the first for a March/Micra). In the end of 2011 Nissan introduced the supercharged version of 1.2 (HR12DDR) called in Europe as Micra 1.2 DIG-S and the other engine 1.5 (HR15DE) and 1.6 (HR16DE) for the South American, Asian and Australian markets. The car is expected to be fuel efficient, delivering 18 km to a litre of petrol. The new idling stop system is reported to improve fuel economy by 2.0 km/L. It features variable control of voltage for power generation with an alternator (including regenerative charging function with braking energy).

The Micra's coefficient of drag is just 0.32 achieved in part by the sleek roofline, with a raised rear end, which optimally adjusts airflow to the rear sides and other elements of the body designed to reduce air resistance such as door mirrors, a large front spoiler and the underbody configuration.

The Nissan March was unveiled at the 2010 Bangkok International Motor Show, followed by 2010 Beijing International Automobile Exhibition, and Nissan Global Headquarter gallery.

Production 
At its introduction, Nissan has stated that the model will be built in at least five countries. On 12 March 2010, Nissan Motor Thailand (NMT) started the production of the March. It is the first car to qualify the Eco Car tax incentives. The Thai-produced March went on sale in Japan since July 2010.

On 24 May 2010, Nissan Motor India (NMIPL) officially started the start of production of the Nissan Micra from the Renault Nissan India (RNAIPL) manufacturing plant at the Chennai plant in Oragadam, Tamil Nadu. Domestic sales in India began in July 2010, while exports began in September 2010. Exports of the Micra to Europe began in October 2010. On 16 June 2011, the Chennai plant had produced 100,000th Nissan Micra. The Renault Pulse was also built at the Chennai plant. Production of the Micra in India ended in April 2020 due to non-compliance to the Bharat Stage 6 emissions norm.

The assembly of the March in Purwakarta, Indonesia began in October 2010. Aside from supplying for the domestic market, Nissan Motor Indonesia (NMI) also exported the March to Australia badged as the Micra. While the domestic March is using the 1.2 L HR12DE engine, the Australia-bound Micra is fitted with the 1.5 L HR15DE engine. The production run was stopped in 2013 in favour of imported units from Thailand.

Production of the March began in Aguascalientes, Mexico in 2011.

Production of the March in China by Dongfeng Nissan started in 2010, and ended in 2015 due to low sales.

At the end of May 2011, global sales of the Nissan Micra/March surpassed six million units.

In September 2020, the Nissan March ended production in Brazil.

In July 2022, the Nissan March ended production in Thailand.

, the K13 Micra/March continued to be produced in Mexico.

Markets 

The Japanese model went on sale on 13 July 2010, with the units sourced from Thailand. Early models include 1.2L 3-cylinder HR12DE engine, Xtronic CVT with an auxiliary two-speed transmission, Idling Stop (standard on 12X and 12G).

The Canadian model was announced at the 2014 Montreal Auto Show. Imported from Mexico, it is equipped with ducts for rear-seat heating, 60/40 split folding rear seat, heated side mirrors, and front and rear sway bars for the suspension. It went on sale as a 2015 model year vehicle. Early models include a 1.6-liter four-cylinder engine from the Versa, a 4-speed automatic or 5-speed manual transmission, and 15- and 16-inch wheels. The Micra was discontinued in Canada after the 2019 model year.

Safety 
The Latin American March has ventilated front disc brakes.

Latin NCAP
The March in its most basic Latin American configuration with 2 airbags received 2 stars for adult occupants and 1 star for toddlers from Latin NCAP in 2011.

The March in its most basic Latin American configuration with 2 airbags, no ABS and no ESC received 3 stars for adult occupants and 2 stars for toddlers from Latin NCAP in 2016.

The March in its most basic Latin American configuration with 2 airbags, no ABS and no ESC received 1 star for adult occupants and 2 stars for toddlers from Latin NCAP in 2018 (one level above as before).

Facelift 
The 2013 facelift of the Micra was unveiled at the 2013 Frankfurt Motor Show. Changes to the Nissan Micra include new exterior styling front and rear (new grille with Nissan badge 'held' within a chromed extended V-shaped motif, new bonnet, wings, headlamps and front bumper; front fog lamps and chrome surround, a new bumper, new LED tail lamps and a new infill panel at the bottom of the tailgate), new 15-inch alloy wheel design (optional machine-finished 16-inch alloy wheels), instrument graphics ahead of the driver have been improved for greater clarity, a new centre console with restyled air vents, gloss black finish on the centre console, a silver look to the gear selector finisher, textured door armrests, new seat and door pad fabrics.

Second facelift 
For the 2021 model year, the second restyling of the March was introduced in Mexico on 29 January 2021, and other Latin American markets afterwards. Changes include a redesigned front and rear styling, updated LED headlamps and taillamps, updated wheel design, and a revised interior design. For the Mexican market, it received upgraded standard safety features including ABS, EBD, 5 seatbelts, and 6 airbags. It is offered on the Sense, Advance, and Exclusive trim lines.

March Nismo 
March Nismo went on sale in Japan on sale in December 2013. with the Nismo S unveiled at the 2014 Tokyo Auto Salon.

The March Nismo includes special exterior design features including front and rear bumpers, LED hyper daytime running lights, 16-inch aluminium wheels and includes Vehicle Dynamic Control (VDC), but retains a standard 1.2-litre engine producing .
The Nismo S version include additional tuning to the HR15DE 1.5-litre engine to produce , with a special tuning computer (ECM), exhaust system, customized suspension (stabiliser) brake system and quick steering gear ratio.

Renault Pulse 

The Renault Pulse is a version of the Micra sold by Renault India Private Limited for the Indian market, designed by Renault's Design Center in Mumbai. Changes include a redesigned front end, new headlights and tail lights, and a redesigned rear bumper. RXZ models is equipped with dual airbags, automatic climate control, engine start/stop button, lock/unlock sensing, folding outside rear-view mirrors, etc. It went on sale from January 2012 at the Auto Expo India. Early models include a 1.5 dCi diesel engine. The Pulse was discontinued in 2017 due to poor sales.

Engines

Transmission 
The K13 Micra has a 5-speed manual transmission. The manual transmission uses up to 15% less fuel than Xtronic CVT depending on driving conditions and style of driving. It also has better durability and can support more horsepower and torque. The manual transmission ratio and the maximum speed in each manual transmission gear (in Thailand spec).

Safety 
EuroNCAP tested this model of the Nissan Micra as a standard equipment LHD, 5-door hatchback, registered in 2010. They scored it accordingly:
 Overall 
 Adult Occupant , 30 points
 Child Occupant , 39 points
 Pedestrian , 21 points
 Safety Assist , 4 points

The Micra scored well in the test and received 4 stars from a possible 5, although the car was penalised for "loading the dummy in an unrealistic way" and increasing chest damage to the driver and passenger. Despite this, the results were decent for a hatchback and the car offers good protection for side and front end impacts.

Fifth generation (K14; 2016)

The fifth-generation Micra, the K14, was unveiled at the 2016 Paris Motor Show. It has all-new exterior and interior design and shares the same platform from its predecessor.

The fifth-generation Micra is only available in Europe and selected markets such as South Africa, Israel, Turkey and Morocco. Sales in Europe began in March 2017. In South Africa, the fifth-generation Micra is sold alongside the fourth-generation Micra Active and sales began in June 2018. By 2022, the Micra Active was no longer sold in South Africa and only the fifth generation "New" Micra was still available. Plans to sell the Micra in Latin America were scrapped since the model will be too expensive. Similar plans to bring the new fifth-generation Micra into Canada were also scrapped since its main selling point was over $10,000, and selling the more recent model would come at a costly price.

Its range of engines is shared the Renault Clio IV. An entry level, 1.0-litre petrol engine that produces  is the base engine, while it was also offered with a 1.5-litre diesel engine that produces  and a 0.9 petrol engine that produces  ( with its overboost function). The K14 Micra comes with a system called trace control, which prevents understeer by softly pinching the brakes.

Marketing by country

Australia
The UK-built Micra K11 was briefly exported to the Australian market beginning in 1995 with a three model line up, base 3-door LX, 5-door SLX and 3-door Super S (of which only
303 were ever sold in Australia and demand a hefty price premium over the other models). Class leading performance, a surprisingly dynamic chassis with well sorted suspension, roomy interior and above average build quality were the Micra's strengths in comparison to its Korean competitors like the Hyundai Excel, Daewoo Cielo and Ford Festiva. A poor exchange rate between the UK and Australia meant the Micra's pricing was rather steep and Australian buyers saw the cheaper Koreans and more established Japanese-sourced superminis, such as the Suzuki Swift and Daihatsu Charade, as offering better value for money. Also, the Micra received the lowest possible rating (one star) in Australian crash tests. The Micra was dropped from Nissan Australia's line-up in 1997.

Nissan reintroduced the Micra to Australia in 2007, being sold only as a 5-door hatchback, and coming from Japan and not the UK. The fourth generation Micra was introduced to Australia in October 2010, with sales began in late 2010, and imported from Thailand. Nissan dropped the Micra from the Australian market on 29 April 2016.

Canada

In Canada, the K10-J was sold and branded as the Nissan Micra. It came standard with the larger MA12S inline 4-cylinder OHC 1.2 L (1235 cc) engine. The Nissan Micra was finally discontinued in Canada in 1991, replaced by the Nissan Sentra Classic.

In 2007, Nissan introduced the substantially larger Versa to the Canadian line up as the new entry-level model.

On 9 January 2014, Nissan Canada Inc. announced the return of the Micra back to the Canadian market after 21 years of absence. Sales started in spring 2014 as a 2015-year model, taking the place of the slow-selling Versa sedan. The car was not sold in the United States.

The company revealed the car's starting price of C$9,998 for the base, 5-speed manual transmission model at the 2014 Canadian International Auto Show in February. The price made it the least expensive new car in the country by a significant margin.

The available three trim levels are: S, SV, and SR.

The base S trim in its most basic configuration comes standard with a 5-speed manual transmission, along with plastic door handles, manual door locks, manual windows, and manual black mirrors, but lacks both air conditioning and cruise control. Furthermore, it includes 15-inch steel wheels with hubcap covers, intermittent rear wipers, large cupholders, 60/40 split folding rear seats, floor mats, and a two-speaker AM/FM/CD player with an aux-in jack as standard equipment. An optional 4-speed automatic transmission for the S trim adds air conditioning, cruise control with steering wheel controls, a USB port, as well as silver accents on the shift knob and steering wheel.

The SV is the mid-trim variant, which adds body-coloured door handles and mirrors, 2 extra rear speakers, a Bluetooth Hands-free phone system, a rearview monitor, power heated mirrors, air conditioning, and cruise control, power door locks with keyless entry, power windows, an armrest, a height-adjustable driver's seat, a passenger grip handle, chromed interior door handles, and an upgraded sporty trim cloth. The SV style package adds 15-inch aluminum alloy wheels and a body-coloured rear spoiler with LED Center high-mounted stop light.

The SR model, being the higher-end trim, adds a rear spoiler and side skirts, giving it a more sporty appearance, as well as the addition of fog lights, a glossy centre console dash, a tiny 4.3-inch colour display audio system with a reverse camera and a USB port, a leather-wrapped steering wheel and shift knob, a chrome exhaust finisher, and 16-inch aluminum black-painted alloy wheels.

All trim levels of the Canadian-spec Micra come standard with a 5-speed manual transmission as well as front-wheel drive and a DOHC 1.6-litre 4-cylinder engine rated at 109 horsepower at 6,000 rpm and 107 lb-ft of torque at 4,400 rpm.

During the final model year, all 2019 Nissan Micra trim models were equipped with a backup camera due to the new regulation law in Transport Canada mandating all new vehicles to be equipped with a backup camera, which took effect starting in mid-2018.

The Micra was once again discontinued after the 2019 model year, due to the new generation Micra being "not budget-friendly". It was instead replaced yet again with the newer third-generation Versa.

China
In China, Dongfeng Nissan released the Micra K13 on 30 August 2010. Four trims with 1.5-liter engines (HR15DE) are available, priced between 69,900 and 92,900 yuan. It has since been discontinued.

India
One of the four factories which produce the Nissan Micra K13 is located in India.

Nissan Micra is available in India with four petrol and two diesel variants. The four petrol variants of Nissan Micra are: Nissan Micra XE, Nissan Micra XE Plus, Nissan Micra XL and Nissan Micra XV. These variants differ from each other by the interior comfort, luxury and safety features. A notable feature includes a standard air bag across the range although ABS is available only on the top variant.

The diesel variants of Nissan Micra are Nissan Micra Diesel XV and Nissan Micra Diesel XV Premium.

A rebranded variant of Micra named "Pulse" is sold by Renault in India. It has the same interiors as the Micra though the styling on the exterior is slightly modified. Having the same specifications, features and engines as the Micra, it is similarly priced.

In India, the Micra was offered with a diesel unit: the  1.5 dCI K9K produced by Renault. It was discontinued on 11 May 2020, alongside the Sunny saloon, due to both cars not being compliant with India's Bharat Stage VI emissions standards, leaving Nissan with the locally-built Kicks and Magnite crossover SUVs and the GT-R as the only cars offered by Nissan for the Indian market.

Mexico
One of the four factories which produce the Nissan Micra K13 is located in Mexico.

The Nissan Micra K13 is called the Nissan March in Mexico and went on sale in late March 2011, it began production at the Aguascalientes plant in early March.

The Nissan March is sold in 4 trim levels: Drive, Sense, Advance and SR.

The base Drive trim level does not have air conditioning and rear window wipers and has black mirrors; this trim level also lacks a radio and comes with 14-inch steel wheels with wheel covers.

The Sense trim level adds air conditioning, MP3 radio player, colour-coded mirrors and a rear window wiper. This model also comes with 14-inch steel wheels with wheel covers.

The Advance trim level adds 15-inch alloy wheels an optional 4-speed automatic transmission and also adds 2 front airbags for the driver and passenger.

The SR trim adds side skirts and a rear spoiler for a more sporty appearance and has the same alloy wheels only with a darker color.

It replaced the Nissan Platina in its assembly plant and lineup, plus the previous-generation Micra was sold in Mexico using the Micra name.
Even though the March was meant to replace the Platina sedan, the Juke (using the same Micra platform) took the Micra's Mexican place after the 2011 model year.

Taiwan
In Taiwan, the K11 March was sold from 1993 to 2007. It was sold in three generations. The last generation was a facelifted and improved version called the Super March. It had a digital instrument cluster, LED rear light clusters, side mirror indicators, and an updated front end with crystal headlights. It also came with a semi leather interior with rear headrests. Another more upscale K11 variant, known as the Nissan Verita, was produced. This featured retro styling inside and out. Notable differences included rounded headlights and taillights, a distinctive front end, along with a chrome and faux wood trimmed interior. All Taiwan K11s came with the CG13DE engine. There was also a three-box sedan called the "March Cubic" designed exclusively for the Taiwanese market by Nissan Yulon; its taillights, trunklid, and rear bumpers were different from those used in Japanese market versions.

At the end of 2011, the Nissan March returned to the Taiwanese market as the K13. The HR15DE is currently the only engine available. A 4-speed automatic is the only transmission option as well. The K13 March was discontinued in 2019.

Thailand
One of the four factories which produce the Nissan Micra K13 was located in Thailand.

In Thailand, the Micra K13 was launched, as Nissan March, at the Bangkok International Motor Show on 26 March 2010, priced from 375,000 baht ($11,600) to 537,000 baht. By early July 2010, the company has received about 8,000 sales order and said new buyers would have to wait for five months. The company expects to produce 90,000 units in 2010.

In April 2013, the facelifted version of March are revealed, with some upgrade on equipment include LED rear lamps, redesigned grille, headlamps, wheels, improved interior and addition of front airbags in all version. The K13 March was discontinued in July 2022.

UK
From 1992 Micras were built in the UK at the NMUK plant in Sunderland, Tyne and Wear, where a total of 2,368,704 were built at its close in July 2010.

K10
The Micra K10 first went on sale the UK over the summer of 1983, and it was an instant sales success. In its best year, 1990, it was the eleventh most popular new car in the UK with just under 50,000 sales. It was a popular choice with driving instructors and undemanding motorists thanks to its ease of driving, solid build and durable mechanical components. 343,411 were sold in nearly a decade. As recently as early 2007, almost 15 years after the last examples were sold, 96,421 examples were still reported to be in circulation, and four years on, as the 20th anniversary of its demise approaches, the number remaining on Britain's roads is likely to be still well into five figures. It compares particularly well to many other popular small cars in Britain of its era, particularly the British-built Austin Metro and Italian Fiat Uno.

K11
The second incarnation of the Micra, the K11, was launched in the UK at the end of 1992, with production taking place in Britain at the Sunderland plant rather than in Japan. It was available with a limited range of engines: 1.0 and 1.3 petrol units. A facelift over the summer of 2000 saw the 1.3 shelved and replaced with a 1.4 unit. This upgrade, after a previous makeover in 1998, enhanced the Micra's appeal and it was still fairly popular on the launch of its successor in December 2002.

The Micra K11 (as it is known in Europe), was the third model after the Nissan Bluebird and Primera built in Nissan's NMUK plant in Sunderland, Tyne and Wear.

In 1998, the Sunderland, plant produced its millionth Micra, becoming the first Japanese manufacturer in Europe to achieve the milestone.

On 16 January 2013, popular YouTube stars Vsauce and FastFuriousAndFunny held up a Nissan Micra K11 with 180 rubber bands. They later smashed the car.

K12
Like the previous version of the Micra, the third generation model, the K12, was made at the Sunderland plant. It had a wider range of engines, including 1.2 petrol and Renault-sourced 1.5 direct-injection diesel powerplants, and offered an improved driving experience. Its chassis would form the basis of the next Renault Clio, launched in 2005 but still built in France. This stylish, all-new Micra helped Nissan bolster its market share of the supermini sector, which had been declining in the final year or two of its predecessor's life. Although it has never featured in the SMMT's official top 10 best-selling cars in the UK, it has been among the best-selling 10 cars in Britain among private buyers for virtually all of its production life.

In 2003, the BBC's Top Gear programme featured a segment on cars that gave value for money, highlighting specification that could be purchased for £9,000. The Micra K12 was selected and tested by presenter Richard Hammond, who gave it a positive review. This was despite comparing its qualities to those of a Boeing 737, concluding that the Micra "had all the toys". However, when Hammond tested the Micra C+C in 2006, he was less than enthusiastic. This was because his model was coloured pink and as a result, he spent most of the segment driving it with a paper bag over his head.

The pink C+C was one of only five, made specifically for Nissan's sponsorship of the C+C TLC Tour in 2005–06, in support of the Breakthrough Breast Cancer charity. Such was the public's response that Nissan subsequently announced the launch of the Micra C+C Pink, limited to 100 units. These quickly sold out and another production run was announced in August 2006, this time limited to 175 cars.

In July 2004, Nissan announced that a Coral Blue K12 Micra had become NMUK's one millionth car for the UK market, and that its Sunderland plant had produced over 250,000 K12s since the model's launch, for sale in up to 45 markets.

In August 2006, the K10 was still receiving credit for its impressive durability. An Auto Express survey revealed that of the 340,000 K10 Micras registered in the UK between 1983 and 1992, 96,000 were still on the road – nearly 30%, an impressive figure for a car which had been out of production for 14 years. This gave it a far higher rating than the Fiat Uno and the Austin Metro, both of which had dwindled away to less than 3%.

In 2007, with the Micra K12C, the model grades were brought into line with the rest of the Nissan UK range, namely Visia, Acenta, Tekna, 160 SR and Active Luxury.

The Micra C+C convertible was available in Visia, Acenta, Tekna and Active Luxury grades. However, the 1.6-litre engine is available for all models, save the Visia.

Reputation and popularity
The K10/K11 generations of Micra were known for reliability, excellent build quality, and user friendliness. The K12 model has received consistently good reviews, with the main criticisms being the lack of head room and luggage space in the rear.

There are numerous tuning parts available for the car.  Many owners transplanted SR20DE and more commonly,  GA16DE engine into their K11s. Turbocharger kits are a popular choice for the K11 and K12s.

The insurance company Folksam rated it as a dangerous car in the event of a crash for the models produced between 1988 and 1995. However, safety specification has improved with successive models. The Micra's Euro NCAP ratings are two stars for the K11 and four for the K12.

The K12 Micra came top of its class in What Car? magazine's Security Supertest in 2003, passing both entry and driveaway tests and achieving a maximum score for its locking system and immobiliser.

In 2005, the UK motor insurance research expert Thatcham introduced a standard for keyless go, requiring the device to be inoperable at a distance of more than 10 cm from the vehicle. In an independent test, the Micra was found to be the most secure, while certain BMW and Mercedes models failed, being theoretically capable of allowing cars to be driven away while their owners were refuelling.

In What Car?s Reliability Supertest in 2007, Nissan was ranked 6th out of 26 manufacturers overall, with the K11 Micra (1998–2002) being its most reliable model.

Motorsport
It was built for the new sub-1600 cc Group A class, and shortly after in 1988 Nissan released the March Superturbo as a road car.

While the March was a favourite with the drivers in the Japanese Rally Championship, veteran Swedish rally driver Per Eklund finished the 1988 RAC Rally in 21st position and the 1989 Acropolis Rally Greece in 10th place.

During the K11's production life, there was a series of national rally championship trophies held all over Europe called the Micra Challenge. This was intended as a cheap introduction to rallying, as the cars all had identical 1.3 L race-prepared engines. The UK series ran between 1995 and 1999. This model is still used in club and national rallies. In France, the 1.3 L model was used as the basis for a circuit racing one-make cup for celebrity drivers, the Nissan Stars Cup. In Portugal, the Micra spawned a one-make trophy alongside the National Rally Championship for Beginners.

Both K10 and K11 models are very popular choices for beginner autocross but due to K10s getting rarer, K11s are more commonly used now. The K11 is also very popular as a 'micro' banger in the UK, competing in 1200 cc engine limit classes with success.

In the late 1990s, a K11 was adapted into a VQ30 mid-engined 4WD configuration to race in the Trophée Andros, the French ice racing series. Drivers who raced this car include Érik Comas, Philippe Gache, Stéphane Peterhansel and Emmanuel Collard.

Nissan sponsors a one-make series in Japan called the March Cup, which has been running since the introduction of the K10. Usually a JGTC support race, it is held in two separate five-round championships called West Japan Series and East Japan Series, and a ladies series running simultaneously. At the end of the season, the best-performing cars from both sides meet up for the Champions Cup final at the end the season.

Beginning of 2015, Nissan Canada sponsored the Nissan Micra Cup'. It consisted 10 races across 5 weekends in Quebec. Each racing weekend included a 30-minute trial, a 30-minute qualifying session, and two 30-minute races.

References

External links

 Nissan March
 Nissan Micra Official website(UK)
 Nissan Museum 
 March SR 
 K10 and K11 history and modifications
 Nissan March K11: 1999–2000, 2000–2001 , 2001–2002
 Nissan March K12: 2002–2004, 2004–2005 , 2005–2007, 2008–2010
 Nissan Museum March

1990s cars
2000s cars
2010s cars
2020s cars
Cars introduced in 1982
Cars of England
Convertibles
Front-wheel-drive vehicles
Hardtop convertibles
Hatchbacks
Micra
Pulse
Subcompact cars
Euro NCAP superminis
Latin NCAP superminis
Vehicles with CVT transmission